Maxim Vyacheslavovich Rybin (born June 15, 1981) is a Russian former ice hockey winger. He last played for Salavat Yulaev Ufa of the Kontinental Hockey League (KHL).

Rybin was selected by the Mighty Ducks of Anaheim in the 5th round (141st overall) of the 1999 NHL Entry Draft and played two junior seasons in North America with the Sarnia Sting of the Ontario Hockey League before returning to play the entirety of his professional career in Russia.

References

External links

1981 births
Living people
Anaheim Ducks draft picks
Avangard Omsk players
HC Lada Togliatti players
Metallurg Novokuznetsk players
HC Neftekhimik Nizhnekamsk players
Salavat Yulaev Ufa players
Sarnia Sting players
Severstal Cherepovets players
SKA Saint Petersburg players
HC Spartak Moscow players
HC Vityaz players
Russian ice hockey left wingers
People from Zhukovsky, Moscow Oblast
Sportspeople from Moscow Oblast